Florijana Ismaili (1 January 1995 – 29 June 2019) was a Swiss footballer  who played as a forward for BSC YB Frauen of Switzerland's Nationalliga A. She was a member of the Switzerland national team.

Early life
Ismaili was born in Switzerland to parents of Albanian origins.

International career
Ismaili debuted for Switzerland women's national football team January 2014, in a 2–1 win over Portugal. On 27 November 2015, she scored for Switzerland against Northern Ireland in a UEFA Women's Euro 2017 qualifying match. On 28 November 2017, she scored twice for Switzerland in a 2019 FIFA Women's World Cup qualifying match against Albania.

15 days before her death, she played in her final match for Switzerland on 14 June 2019 against Serbia.

Death
On 29 June 2019, Ismaili dived into the water from a boat diving platform while on holiday at Lake Como in Lombardy, but did not resurface. The next day, she was declared missing. Local authorities conducted an investigation, including using remotely operated underwater vehicles (ROV). On 2 July, Ismaili's body was found at the bottom of Lake Como at a depth of 204 metres (669 feet). An autopsy revealed that the cause of death was "an acute episode of asphyxia."

Career statistics

International (2014–2019)

International goals
Scores and results list Switzerland's goal tally first, score column indicates score after each Ismaili goal.

See also
List of solved missing person cases

References

External links
 Profile at FC Zürich 

1995 births
2010s missing person cases
2015 FIFA Women's World Cup players
2019 deaths
Deaths by drowning
Deaths in Italy
Formerly missing people
Missing person cases in Italy
Swiss Women's Super League players
People from Aarberg
Switzerland women's international footballers
Swiss people of Albanian descent
Swiss women's footballers
Women's association football forwards
Women's association football midfielders
BSC YB Frauen players
Sportspeople from the canton of Bern